Robert or Bob Casey may refer to:
Bob Casey Sr. (1932–2000), 42nd Governor of Pennsylvania, 1987–1995
Bob Casey Jr. (born 1960), his son, current United States Senator from Pennsylvania, 2007–present
Robert E. Casey (1909–1982), no relation to any of the above, Pennsylvania Treasurer, 1977–1981
Robert R. Casey (1915–1986), member of the United States House of Representatives from Texas
Bob Casey (baseball announcer) (1925–2005), Minnesota Twins baseball announcer
Bob Casey (third baseman) (1859–1939), Canadian baseball player
Bob Casey (rugby union) (born 1978), London Irish rugby player
Robert Casey (journalist) (1890–1962), American journalist
Robert K. Casey (1931–2015), member of the Florida House of Representatives
Robert F. Casey (1921–2006), member of the Illinois House of Representatives
Robert Gerald Casey (born 1967), American priest of the Catholic Church
Bob Casey (musician) (1909–1986), American jazz bassist